The Roman Catholic Diocese of Litoměřice   is a diocese located in the city of Litoměřice in the Ecclesiastical province of Prague in the Czech Republic.

History
 July 3, 1655: Established as Diocese of Litoměřice from Metropolitan Archdiocese of Praha

Special churches

Minor Basilicas:
 Bazilika Panny Marie Bolestné, Krupka, Ústecký kraj (Basilica of Our Lady of Sorrows)
 Bazilika Panny Marie Pomocnice křesťanů, Jiříkov, Ústecký kraj (Basilica of Our Lady Help of Christians)
 Bazilika sv. Vavřince a sv. Zdislavy, Jablonné v Podještědí, Liberecký kraj (Basilica of St. Lawrence and St. Zdislava)
 Bazilika Všech svatých, Česká Lípa, Liberecký kraj(Basilica of All Saints)

Leadership
 Bishops of Litoměřice (Roman rite)
 Bishop Jan Baxant (since 2008.10.04)
 Bishop Dominik Duka, O.P. (Apostolic Administrator since 2004.11.06)
 Bishop Pavel Posád (2003.12.24 – 2008.01.26)
 Bishop Josef Koukl (1989.07.26 – 2003.12.24)
 Cardinal Štěpán Trochta, S.D.B. (1947.09.27 – 1974.04.06)
 Archbishop Antonín Alois Weber (1931.10.22 – 1947.03.10)
 Bishop Josef Gross (1910.04.20 – 1931.01.20)
 Bishop Emanuel Jan Schöbel (1882 – 1909.11.28)
 Bishop Antonín Ludvík Frind (1879 – 1881.10.18)
 Bishop Augustin Pavel Wahala (1866 – 1877.09.10)
 Bishop Augustin Bartoloměj Hille (1832 – 1865.04.26)
 Archbishop Vinzenz Eduard Milde (1823.01.16 – 1832.03.19)
 Bishop Josef František Hurdálek (1815.12.18 – 1822.09.28)
 Archbishop Václav Leopold Chlumčanský (1801.10.15 – 1815.03.15)
 Bishop Ferdinand Kindermann (1790.02.04 – 1801.05.25)
 Bishop Emmanuel Ernst Reichsgraf von Waldstein (1759.07.19 – 1789.12.07)
 Bishop Moritz Adolf Karl Herzog von Sachsen-Zeitz (1733.07.04 – 1759.06.20)
 Bishop Johann Adam Reichsgraf von Wratislaw von Mitrowitz (1721.01.09 – 1733.06.02)
 Bishop Hugo František von Königsegg-Rothenfels (1709.08.06 – 1720.09.06)
 Bishop Jaroslav František Ignác von Sternberg (1675.10.30 – 1709.04.12)
 Bishop Maxmilián Rudolf Schleinitz (1655.07.02 – 1675.10.13)

See also
Roman Catholicism in the Czech Republic

Sources
 GCatholic.org
 Catholic Hierarchy
 Diocese website

Roman Catholic dioceses in the Czech Republic
Religious organizations established in the 1650s
1655 establishments in the Holy Roman Empire
Roman Catholic dioceses and prelatures established in the 17th century
Litoměřice